is a Japanese alpine skier and Paralympian.

Career
He competed in the 2002 Winter Paralympics in Salt Lake City, United States, where he placed sixth at the Slalom and eighth at the Giant slalom, sitting LW11.

At the 2006 Winter Paralympics in Turin, Italy, he took the silver medal in the Giant slalom, sitting, and he placed ninth in the Downhill, fourth in the Slalom, and sixth in the Super-G, sitting.

He competed at the 2010 Winter Paralympics in Vancouver, British Columbia, Canada.
He won a silver medal in the Downhill and bronze in the Super-G, sitting. He placed seventh at the Giant slalom, seventh in the Slalom, and fourth in the Super combined, sitting.

External links
 
 
 Winners, Tokyo Sports Awards, sports-tokyo.info

1980 births
Living people
Japanese male alpine skiers
Paralympic alpine skiers of Japan
Alpine skiers at the 2002 Winter Paralympics
Alpine skiers at the 2006 Winter Paralympics
Alpine skiers at the 2010 Winter Paralympics
Alpine skiers at the 2022 Winter Paralympics
Paralympic silver medalists for Japan
Paralympic bronze medalists for Japan
Medalists at the 2006 Winter Paralympics
Medalists at the 2010 Winter Paralympics
Medalists at the 2022 Winter Paralympics
Paralympic medalists in alpine skiing
21st-century Japanese people